The Town of New Castle is a home rule municipality in Garfield County, Colorado, United States. The population was 4,518 at the 2010 census, up from 1,984 at the 2000 census.

History
When New Castle was incorporated in 1888, its economy was largely based on mining coal that was needed by the silver-mining industry to fire silver smelters.  On February 18, 1896, a methane explosion in the Vulcan Mine killed 49 men and started a coal fire that was still burning as of 2020.  The Vulcan reopened and suffered additional explosions on December 12, 1913 (killing 37) and November 4, 1918 (killing 3).

There are at least 25 coal fires burning near the town.  They are normally confined underground, but in 2002 the Coal Seam Fire destroyed thirty houses in New Castle. 

From 2000 - 2014 the population grew 129%, much higher than the average growth in Colorado over the same period (20.8%).

Geography
New Castle is located at  (39.572304, -107.534941), on the north side of the Colorado River, just east of where the river cuts through the Grand Hogback. Interstate 70 passes through the town following the river, with access from Exit 105. I-70 leads east  to Glenwood Springs, the county seat, east  to Denver, and west  to Grand Junction. U.S. Route 6 is Main Street in New Castle and forms a parallel route to I-70 for local traffic.

Demographics

As of the census of 2000, there were 1,984 people, 705 households, and 537 families residing in the town. The racial makeup of the town was 94.61% White, 0.30% African American, 0.55% Native American, 0.35% Asian, 3.28% from other races, and 0.91% from two or more races. Hispanic or Latino of any race were 11.90% of the population.

There were 705 households, out of which 48.8% had children under the age of 18 living with them, 64.7% were married couples living together, 8.1% had a female householder with no husband present, and 23.7% were non-families. 16.7% of all households were made up of individuals, and 2.0% had someone living alone who was 65 years of age or older. The average household size was 2.81 and the average family size was 3.18.

In the town, the population was spread out, with 31.9% under the age of 18, 9.5% from 18 to 24, 38.9% from 25 to 44, 16.4% from 45 to 64, and 3.4% who were 65 years of age or older. The median age was 30 years. For every 100 females, there were 100.0 males. For every 100 females age 18 and over, there were 99.6 males.

The median income for a household in the town was $55,000, and the median income for a family was $58,889. Males had a median income of $39,597 versus $27,933 for females. The per capita income for the town was $21,356. About 2.9% of families and 4.4% of the population were below the poverty line, including 5.1% of those under age 18 and 13.3% of those age 65 or over.

Education
It is within Garfield Re-2 School District. Coal Ridge High School is in New Castle.

See also

 List of municipalities in Colorado

References

External links

 Town of New Castle official website
 CDOT map of the Town of New Castle

Towns in Garfield County, Colorado
Towns in Colorado
Populated places established in 1890
1890 establishments in Colorado